Đại Từ is a rural district of Thái Nguyên province in the Northeast region of Vietnam. As of 2003 the district had a population of 163,637 . The district covers an area of 578 km². The district capital lies at Hùng Sơn.

Administrative divisions
Hùng Sơn, Quân Chu, An Khánh, Bản Ngoại, Bình Thuận, Cát Nê, Cù Vân, Đức Lương, Hà Thượng, Hoàng Nông, Khôi Kỳ, Ký Phú, La Bằng, Lục Ba, Minh Tiến, Mỹ Yên, Na Mao, Phú Cường, Phú Lạc, Phú Thịnh, Phú Xuyên, Phúc Lương, Phục Linh, Quân Chu, Tân Linh, Tân Thái, Tiên Hội, Vạn Thọ, Văn Yên, Yên Lãng

References

Districts of Thái Nguyên province
Thái Nguyên province